List of MPs elected in the 1715 British general election

This is a list of the 558 MPs or Members of Parliament elected to the 314 constituencies of the Parliament of Great Britain in 1715, the 5th Parliament of Great Britain and their replacements returned at subsequent by-elections, arranged by constituency.

Elections took place between 22 January 1715 and 9 March 1715.



By-elections 
List of Great Britain by-elections (1715–34)

See also
1715 British general election
List of parliaments of Great Britain
Unreformed House of Commons

References

 The House of Commons 1690–1715, eds. D. Hayton, E. Cruickshanks, and S. Handley (2002)

External links
 History of Parliament: Members 1715–1754
 History of Parliament: Constituencies 1715–1754

1715
1715
1715 in Great Britain
Lists of Members of the Parliament of Great Britain